is a former Japanese football player.

Playing career
Kono was born in Yugawara, Kanagawa on July 9, 1982. After graduating from Shimizu Commercial High School, he joined J1 League club Sanfrecce Hiroshima in 2001. He played 2 matches as substitute defender in 2002 J.League Cup. However he could only play these 2 matches until June 2003. In June 2003, he moved to J2 League club Yokohama FC. He became a regular center back soon. Although his opportunity to play decreased from 2004, he played many matches. In 2006, he moved to Mito HollyHock. He played as regular center back. In 2007, he moved to Tokushima Vortis. Although he played as regular center back, he could not play at all in the match for injury from June. Although he played as substitute player last 2 matches in 2008 season, he retired end of 2008 season.

Club statistics

References

External links

1982 births
Living people
Association football people from Kanagawa Prefecture
Japanese footballers
J1 League players
J2 League players
Sanfrecce Hiroshima players
Yokohama FC players
Mito HollyHock players
Tokushima Vortis players
Association football defenders
Yugawara, Kanagawa